Sayyed Ahmed Abdel-Maqssuod (سيد أحمد عبدالمقصود) was arrested in September 1998 in the United Kingdom, and accused of membership in al-Jihad.

He was arrested as part of Operation Challenge, which arrested seven men living in Britain through use of the Prevention of Terrorism Act 1989, accusing them of links to al-Jihad. One of the men was charged with possession of a weapon. Six months after the arrests, British Muslims staged a demonstration in front of 10 Downing Street to protest the continued incarceration of the seven men.

References

Living people
Year of birth missing (living people)